Asturias (Leyenda), named simply Leyenda by its composer, is a musical work by the Spanish composer and pianist Isaac Albéniz (1860-1909).

The piece, which lasts around six minutes in performance, was originally written for the piano and set in the key of G minor. It was first published in Barcelona, by Juan Bta. Pujol & Co., in 1892 as the prelude of a three-movement set entitled Chants d'Espagne.

The name Asturias (Leyenda) was given to it posthumously by the German publisher Hofmeister, who included it in the 1911 "complete version" of the Suite española, although Albéniz never intended the piece for this suite. Despite the new name, this music is not considered suggestive of the folk music of the northern Spanish region of Asturias, but rather of Andalusian flamenco traditions (although the drama of the music is congruent with the landscape of the region of Asturias).  Leyenda, Hofmeister's subtitle, means legend. The piece is noted for the delicate, intricate melody of its middle section and abrupt dynamic changes.

Albéniz's biographer, Walter Aaron Clark, describes the piece as "pure Andalusian flamenco". In the main theme the piano mimics the guitar technique of alternating the thumb and fingers of the right hand, playing a pedal-note open string with the index finger and a melody with the thumb. The theme itself suggests the rhythm of the bulería—a fast flamenco form. The "marcato"/"staccato" markings suggest both guitar sounds and the footwork of a flamenco dancer. The piece sounds as though it is written in the Phrygian mode which is typical of bulerías. The second section is reminiscent of a copla—a sung verse following a specific form. Clark states that it is written in typical Albéniz form as it is "presented monophonically but doubled at the fifteenth for more fullness of sound." The music alters between a solo and accompaniment that is typical of flamenco. The short middle section of the piece is written in the style of a malagueña—another flamenco style piece. The malagueña borrows two motives from the previous copla and builds on them. The piece returns to its first theme until a slow "hymn-like" passage ends the piece.

Guitar versions

It is not possible to transcribe the piece note for note for guitar. The original version makes uses of the piano keyboard's wider range compared to the tessitura of the guitar, and the key is not suitable for the guitar.

Many have attributed the first transcription for guitar to Francisco Tárrega who put it in its most recognizable key, E minor. According to the guitarist and guitar scholar Stanley Yates, the first guitar transcription of the piece was probably by Severino García Fortea, although Andrés Segovia's transcription is the most famous and most influential. The piece has become one of the most important works of the classical guitar repertoire. Robbie Krieger, guitarist of The Doors, uses a reworking of the melody from this classical piece in The Doors song "Spanish Caravan" from their 1968 album Waiting for the Sun.

Iron Maiden quotes Asturias in their songs Mother Russia and To Tame A Land.

Also Children of Bodom attributed their Angels don't Kill song to Asturias and Elley Duhé song "Middle of the Night" is based on Asturias.

References

External links
 http://stanleyyates.com/articles/albeniz/leyenda.html

Spanish compositions for solo piano
Compositions for guitar
Compositions by Isaac Albéniz
1892 compositions
1890s in Spanish music
Articles containing video clips